Barnes–Jewish West County Hospital (named Faith Hospital until its purchase by BJC HealthCare) is a 108-bed hospital within Greater St. Louis in the western St. Louis County, Missouri suburb of Creve Coeur. The hospital is located along the major arterial Olive Boulevard (Missouri Route 340), one mile west of Interstate 270.

The campus consists of Washington University School of Medicine and private practice physicians. Barnes–Jewish West County Hospital is a member of BJC HealthCare and employs nearly 500 healthcare professionals. It's also a site of the Alvin J. Siteman Cancer Center.

In media
The hospital was featured in Trauma: Life in the E.R.

External links
 Barnes-Jewish Hospital website
 BJC HealthCare

Hospitals established in 1989
Teaching hospitals in Missouri
Jewish medical organizations
Washington University in St. Louis
Healthcare in St. Louis County, Missouri
1989 establishments in Missouri
Buildings and structures in St. Louis County, Missouri